BEP may refer to:

 Bellary Airport, India (IATA code BEP)
 Benign enlargement of the prostate, or benign prostatic hyperplasia, noncancerous increase in size of the prostate
 BEP chemotherapy consisting of bleomycin, etoposide and cisplatin for testicular, ovarian and other cancers
 Best efficiency point, the point on a pump curve that yields the most efficient operation
 BitTorrent enhancement proposal
 Break-even point, where any difference between plus or minus or equivalent changes side
 Bureau of Engraving and Printing of the US Treasury
 The Black Eyed Peas, an American hip-hop group
 BOP clade of grasses, formerly BEP clade
 Bell–Evans–Polanyi principle, a relation between activation energies and reaction energies in chemistry
 Brookfield Renewable Energy Partners, LP, NYSE:BEP

See also
Beep (disambiguation)
BEF (disambiguation)